Hilbre Island Lighthouse is located on Hilbre Island acting as a port landmark for the Hilbre swash in the River Dee estuary. It was established in 1927 by the Mersey Docks and Harbour Board Authority, now the Mersey Docks and Harbour Company, but has been operated by Trinity House since 1973.  It was converted from acetylene gas to solar-power operation in 1995.

See also

 List of lighthouses in England

References

External links

 Trinity House

Lighthouses completed in 1927
Lighthouses in England